The following is a complete list of LSU Tigers football seasons through the 2021 
season. LSU competes as part of the National Collegiate Athletic Association (NCAA) Division I Football Bowl Subdivision, representing the Louisiana State University in the Western Division of the Southeastern Conference (SEC). LSU plays their home games at Tiger Stadium in Baton Rouge, Louisiana.

The LSU Tigers claim four national championships, all of which were awarded by the AP or Coaches' wire-service polls, Bowl Championship Series or College Football Playoff. They were selected as National Champions on three additional occasions, though the program does not claim these titles. LSU has won 15 conference championships with 12 being Southeastern Conference championships. LSU has 812 official wins ranking it twelfth all-time for Division I FBS teams. The LSU Tigers first fielded a football team in 1893.

Seasons

References

LSU

LSU Tigers football seasons